A list of films produced in South Korea in 1984:

References

External links
1984 in South Korea

 1980-1989 at www.koreanfilm.org

1984
South Korean
1984 in South Korea